Josef Wagner the Younger (March 2, 1901 - February 10, 1957)  was a Czech painter and sculptor.

A pupil of Jan Štursa and Josef Mařatka,  he studied sculpture at the Academy of Fine Arts from 1922 to 1926. He was later a professor at the Art School in Prague. Here he met his future wife, Marie Kulhánková, a sculptor, with whom he had two sons, who later became artists themselves.

Warm stone colors best suited his own personal style, inspired by archaic Greece and the Czech Baroque style.

There is a statue in his memory in Prague.

Selected works
 Ležící torzo, 1935
 Poezie, 1936 
 Oblaka a Země, 1938 
 Útisk, 1944 
 Utrpení, 1947 
 Pomník povstání ve Světlé Hůrce ve Slezsku, 1928–29 
 Pomník Jaroslava Vrchlického na Petříně v Praze, 1936–56 
 Pomník Bedřicha Smetany v Karlových Varech, 1936–49 
 Pomník padlým ve Dvoře Králové, 1948–54.

Literature
 J. Pečírka, Sochař Josef Wagner. Prague 1959
 J. M. Tomeš, Sochař Josef Wagner. Prague 1985

See also
List of Czech painters

References

Czech sculptors
Czech male sculptors
1901 births
1957 deaths
Academic staff of the Academy of Fine Arts, Prague
Academy of Fine Arts, Prague alumni
20th-century sculptors
20th-century Czech painters
Czech male painters
20th-century Czech male artists